Stephen Andrew Mura (born February 12, 1955) is an American retired Major League Baseball player. A pitcher, Mura played from - with the San Diego Padres, St. Louis Cardinals, Chicago White Sox, and Oakland Athletics. He was a member of the Cardinals' 1982 World Series winning team.

Mura played college baseball at Tulane University from 1974 to 1976.

External links

1955 births
Living people
Major League Baseball pitchers
San Diego Padres players
Chicago White Sox players
Oakland Athletics players
St. Louis Cardinals players
Hawaii Islanders players
Tulane Green Wave baseball players
Baseball players from New Orleans
Amarillo Gold Sox players
Denver Bears players
Peninsula Oilers players
Portland Beavers players
Tacoma Tigers players
Walla Walla Padres players